Aboubacar Camara (born 10 July 1998) is a Guinean football striker for Hafia FC.

References

1998 births
Living people
Guinean footballers
Guinea international footballers
Hafia FC players
Association football forwards
Guinea A' international footballers
2018 African Nations Championship players